State Highway 176 (SH 176) is a Texas state highway running from the New Mexico state line east to Big Spring. It is most commonly known as the Andrews Highway.

History
SH 176 was originally designated on September 22, 1932 as a connector route between Tyler and the Gregg/Rusk County Line. On May 23, 1933, SH 176 was extended to Kilgore. On September 26, 1939, this route had been reassigned to SH 31 when its path was shifted south.

The current routing was first cosigned, but not designated, on September 29, 1953 concurrent with FM 87. On August 29, 1990 this route was officially designated, canceling FM 87.

Major intersections

References

176
Transportation in Andrews County, Texas
Transportation in Martin County, Texas
Transportation in Howard County, Texas